Sillus is a genus of anyphaenid sac spiders first described by Frederick Octavius Pickard-Cambridge in 1900.

Species
 it contains ten species:
Sillus attiguus (O. Pickard-Cambridge, 1896) — Mexico
Sillus curvispina F. O. Pickard-Cambridge, 1900 — Panama
Sillus delicatus Mello-Leitão, 1922 — Brazil
Sillus dubius (Chickering, 1937) — Panama
Sillus furciger Caporiacco, 1954 — French Guiana
Sillus imbecillus (Keyserling, 1891) — Brazil
Sillus longispina F. O. Pickard-Cambridge, 1900 — Guatemala, Costa Rica, Panama
Sillus lunula F. O. Pickard-Cambridge, 1900 — Guatemala
Sillus pellucidus (Keyserling, 1891) — Brazil
Sillus ravus Chickering, 1940 — Panama

References

External links

Anyphaenidae
Araneomorphae genera